Tevita Leo-Latu (born 3 July 1981) is a professional rugby league footballer who plays as a  for the Point Chevalier Pirates. He previously played for the New Zealand Warriors and the Cronulla-Sutherland Sharks in the NRL and the Wakefield Trinity Wildcats in the Super League.

Background
Leo-Latu was born in Auckland, New Zealand.

Childhood and early career
Latu began playing rugby league at a young age in Auckland for his local club side Richmond Rovers, though he did not start to seriously contemplate a professional career in league until his late teens when he started playing for the Brothers club in the New Zealand Bartercard Cup competition. It was there where his skills were noticed by the New Zealand Warriors whom immediately signed him up to their playing roster for the beginning of the 2003 season.

New Zealand Warriors
Latu made his début for the New Zealand side coming off the bench during round twelve of the 2003 season against the Cronulla-Sutherland Sharks, a match in which Latu helped his club to a good victory of 23 to 6.

He spent the next two seasons at the club falling both in and out of favour with the team's selectors seeing him make only a further thirteen appearances from 2003 to 2004 for the club after his début.

After some impressive performances for his club during the 2004 season Latu was called up to the New Zealand national rugby league team international side for the middle of the year one-off test match against the Australians. Latu started on the bench eventually coming on to make his international début.

After some loss of form and falling out of favour with the Warriors coaching staff during the 2005 season where he was only given a mere eight appearances, the club decided to release Latu at the completion of the NRL season.

Cronulla-Sutherland Sharks
Tevita signed for the Cronulla-Sutherland Sharks at the beginning of the 2006 season, immediately becoming a regular selection in the Sharks seventeen. He was often used as an interchange hooker often replacing Kevin Kingston on the field for the Sharks adding a much needed attacking spark. Latu played a total of ten games for the club before being involved in an off field assault and subsequently having his contract terminated by the club.

On 23 May 2006 it was reported that Latu had been involved in an altercation in the early hours of the morning before with a 19-year-old woman in Cronulla.

As further details emerged, it was revealed that Latu and the alleged victim Brooke Peninton had both been present at Cronulla's Kingsway BP service station at 3.am. the previous Sunday. Allegedly the two individuals had been in discussion before an altercation arose ending with Latu assaulting Peninton, punching her in the face, resulting in a broken nose and other minor injuries.

Latu was arrested the following day at 11.30 p.m. and charged by police with assault occasioning actual bodily harm. He had been granted police bail to face Sutherland Local Court on 15 June.

Latu had his contract with the Cronulla-Sutherland Sharks terminated as a result of the incident. On Wednesday, 24 May The Sydney Morning Herald announced that the NRL had de-registered Latu as a player, and stated that it would refuse to register him if he signed with another club. Other sporting codes were urged to follow the NRL's lead .

He was sentenced to eight months' periodic detention for his actions but was later reduced to community service after an appeal on 10 July 2006.

Wakefield Trinity
After serving his time, Latu was signed by Super League club Wakefield Trinity Wildcats.

On 7 August 2007 Tevita Leo-Latu received a six-match ban for making a racist remark toward Warrington Wolves' Kevin Penny on 17 June earlier that year.

In August 2008, Leo-Latu was named in the Tonga training squad for the 2008 Rugby League World Cup, and in October 2008 he was named in the final 24-man Tonga squad.

Later years
In 2011 Latu spent the season with the Central Queensland Comets in the Queensland Cup. He returned to New Zealand in 2012 and played for the Point Chevalier Pirates in the Auckland Rugby League competition and the Auckland Vulcans in the NSW Cup. In 2013 he played for the Akarana Falcons in the National Competition. In 2015, while playing for Point Chevalier, he was selected for Auckland.

He was convicted of drink-driving in 2015 and banned from driving for the mandatory minimum of six months.

In 2016, he was named to play for the New Zealand Residents side.

References

External links
 "Footy player charged with assault on teen" 23 May 2006, News.com.au, retrieved 18 June 2006
 "Blues selectors scratching their heads" 18 June 2006, AAP, retrieved 18 June 2006
 "Blues selectors scratching their heads" 18 June 2006, AAP, retrieved 18 June 2006
 "NRL sacks Latu for bashing woman" by Jacquelin Magnay 24 May 2006, Sydney Morning Herald, retrieved 18 June 2006
Wakefield Wildcats profile
Tevita Latu NRL Profile
Richmond profile
Leo-Latu punished for racist jibe

1981 births
Living people
Auckland rugby league team players
New Zealand rugby league players
New Zealand sportspeople of Tongan descent
New Zealand national rugby league team players
New Zealand Warriors players
Cronulla-Sutherland Sharks players
Richmond Bulldogs players
Marist Richmond Brothers players
Central Queensland Capras players
Point Chevalier Pirates players
Rugby league hookers
Rugby league players from Auckland
Tonga national rugby league team players
Wakefield Trinity players